The 2001–02 Spartan South Midlands Football League season is the 5th in the history of Spartan South Midlands Football League a football competition in England.

At the end of the previous season the Senior Division was renamed Division One, while Division One was renamed Division Two.

Premier Division

The Premier Division featured 18 clubs which competed in the division last season, along with two clubs, promoted from the Senior Division:
Dunstable Town
Letchworth

League table

Division One

The previous season Senior Division and Division One changed names to Division One and Division Two accordingly. Division One featured 15 clubs which competed in the Senior Division last season, along with five new clubs:
Kings Langley, joined from the Herts County League
Pitstone & Ivinghoe United, promoted from old Division One
The 61, promoted from old Division One
Welwyn Garden City, relegated from the Premier Division
Winslow United, promoted from old Division One

League table

Division Two

The previous season Division One changed name to Division Two before this season. Division Two featured 14 clubs which competed in the Division One last season, along with four new clubs.
Two clubs relegated from the Senior Division:
Luton Old Boys
Totternhoe

Two new clubs:
Cranfield United
Padbury United

League table

References

External links
 FCHD Spartan South Midlands Football League page

2001–02
2001–02 in English football leagues